This is a list of episodes of the 2015 Bob the Builder series, which airs on Channel 5 in the UK. It ran from 1 September 2015 to 30 December 2018.

Series overview

Episodes

Series 1 (2015–16)

Series 2 (2016–17)

Series 3 (2018)

Special (2017)

References

 
Bob the Builder
Bob the Builder
Bob the Builder